Nicole Conn (born October 29, 1959) is an American film director, producer, and screenwriter most famous for her debut feature, the lesbian love story Claire of the Moon (1992). Her screenplay for Claire of the Moon was also released as a novel the following year.

Career
Conn received a degree in business and began her filmmaking career with the goal of bringing non-mainstream screenplays to wider audiences. She is a co-founder of Preemie World, a website created to help connect NICU professionals and the parents of premature babies with resources and tools.

Companies
 Demi-Monde Productions (1987)
 Little Man Nicholas, LLC (2002)

little man
Conn's 2005 documentary  little man is about the extremely premature birth of her son, Nicholas. Born 100 days too early, Nicholas weighed only one pound. The film is the winner of many film festival awards from around the United States.

Personal life
Conn identifies as a lesbian. She was in a relationship with Marina Rice Bader.

Filmography

Bibliography
 The Wedding Dress
 1993: Claire of the Moon
 1995: Passion's Shadow
 1997: Angel Wings
 2001: She Walks in Beauty

See also
 List of female film and television directors
 List of lesbian filmmakers
 List of LGBT-related films directed by women

References

External links 
 
 
 Nicole Conn at Reel Women's Network
 Interview with Director Nicole Conn, AfterEllen (July 24, 2020)
 Little Man website (archive)
 Preemie World website

1959 births
Living people
American women film directors
American lesbian artists
American lesbian writers
LGBT film directors
Film directors from Arizona
Writers from Mesa, Arizona
21st-century American women writers